Raa is a Nordic surname. Notable people with the surname include:

Hedvig Raa-Winterhjelm (1838–1907), Swedish actor
Jan Raa (born 1939), Norwegian biologist
Torolf Raa (born 1933), Norwegian diplomat

See also
Raas (surname)

Surnames of Scandinavian origin